Queen of Heaven is a title given to the Virgin Mary, by Christians mainly of the Catholic Church and, to a lesser extent, in Anglicanism, Lutheranism, and Eastern Orthodoxy. The title has long been a tradition, included in prayers and devotional literature and seen in Western art in the subject of the Coronation of the Virgin from the High Middle Ages, long before it was given a formal definition status by the Church.

The Catholic teaching on this subject is expressed in the papal encyclical Ad Caeli Reginam, issued by Pope Pius XII in 1954. It states that Mary is called Queen of Heaven because her son, Jesus Christ, is the king of Israel and the heavenly king of the universe; indeed, the Davidic tradition of Israel recognized the mother of the king as the queen mother of Israel.

Theological basis
Queen of Heaven is one of many Queen titles used of Mary, mother of Jesus. The title derived in part from the ancient Catholic teaching that Mary, at the end of her earthly life, was bodily and spiritually assumed into heaven, and that she is there honored as Queen.

Pius XII explained on the theological reasons for her title of Queen in a radio message to Fatima of May 13, 1946, Bendito seja: He, the Son of God, reflects on His heavenly Mother the glory, the majesty and the dominion of His kingship, for, having been associated to the King of Martyrs in the ... work of human Redemption as Mother and cooperator, she remains forever associated to Him, with a practically unlimited power, in the distribution of the graces which flow from the Redemption. Jesus is King throughout all eternity by nature and by right of conquest: through Him, with Him, and subordinate to Him, Mary is Queen by grace, by divine relationship, by right of conquest, and by singular choice [of the Father].

In his 1954 encyclical Ad caeli reginam ("To the Queen of Heaven"), Pius XII asserts that Mary deserves the title because she is Mother of God, because she is closely associated as the New Eve with Jesus' redemptive work, because of her preeminent perfection and because of her intercessory power. Ad caeli reginam states that the main principle on which the royal dignity of Mary rests is her Divine Motherhood. ... So with complete justice St. John Damascene could write: "When she became Mother of the Creator, she truly became Queen of every creature."

Biblical basis 
In the Hebrew Bible some Davidic kings had in their court a gebirah ("Great Lady") who was often their mother, and held great power as his advisor and an advocate to him. In 1 Kings 2:20, Solomon said to his mother Bathsheba, seated on a throne at his right, "Make your request, Mother, for I will not refuse you." William G. Most sees here a sort of type of Mary.

In the New Testament, the title has several biblical sources. At the Annunciation, the archangel Gabriel announces that [Jesus] "... will be great, and will be called the Son of the Most High; and the Lord God will give to him the throne of his father David. He will rule over the house of Jacob forever and his reign will be without end."(Luke 1:32) The biblical precedent in ancient Israel is that the mother of the king becomes the queen mother.  Mary's queenship is a share in Jesus’ kingship.

Theologians view Woman of the apocalyse in Revelation 12:1–3 as a foresight to the Virgin Mary, both the mother of God and the mother of church; taking Revelation 12 as a reference to Mary, Israel, and the Church as a threefold symbolism through the Book of Isaiah and affirms Mary as the mother of Jesus Christ as the prophetic fulfilment described in Revelation 12 (cf. Isaiah 7:14, 26:17, 54:1, 66:7). However, the 1954 papal encyclical Ad Caeli Reginam on the queenship of Mary made no reference to Revelation 12.

Historical practice

In the fourth century, St. Ephrem called Mary "Lady" and "Queen". Later Church fathers and doctors continued to use the title. A text probably coming from Origen (died ) gives her the title domina, the feminine form of Latin dominus, Lord. That same title also appears in many other early writers, e.g., Jerome, and Peter Chrysologus. The first Mariological definition and basis for the title of Mary Queen of Heaven developed at the Council of Ephesus, where Mary was defined to be the Mother of God. The Council fathers specifically approved this version against the opinion, that Mary is "only" the mother of Jesus. Nobody had participated in the life of her son more, than Mary, who gave birth to the Son of God.

The word "Queen" is common during and after the sixth century. Hymns of the 11th to 13th centuries address Mary as queen: “Hail, Holy Queen,” “Hail, Queen of Heaven,” “Queen of Heaven”. The Dominican rosary and the Franciscan crown, as well as numerous invocations in Mary’s litany, celebrate her queenship.  For centuries she has been invoked as the Queen of Heaven.

Litany of Loreto

She is invoked in the Litany of Loreto as:
 Queen of the Angels, 
 Queen of Patriarchs,
 Queen of Prophets, 
 Queen of Apostles, 
 Queen of Martyrs, 
 Queen of Confessors, 
 Queen of Virgins, 
 Queen of all Saints
 Queen of Families.
 Queen conceived without original sin
 Queen assumed into Heaven
 Queen of the Most Holy Rosary
 Queen of Peace

Other titles 

The Second Vatican Council in 1964 referred to Mary as Queen of the Universe.

Liturgy of the Hours 

The four ancient Marian antiphons of the Liturgy of the Hours express the queenship of Mary: the Salve Regina, the Ave Regina caelorum, the Alma Redemptoris Mater, and the Regina Caeli. These are prayed at different times of the year, at the end of Compline.

Salve Regina 

Mary as Queen of Heaven is praised in the Salve Regina "(Hail Queen)", which is sung in the time from Trinity Sunday until the Saturday before the first Sunday of Advent. A German Benedictine monk, Hermann of Reichenau (1013–1054), allegedly composed it and it originally appeared in Latin, the prevalent language of the Catholic Church until Vatican II. Traditionally it has been sung in Latin, though many translations exist. In the Middle Ages, Salve Regina offices were held every Saturday. In the 13th century, the custom developed to greet the Queen of Heaven with the Salve Regina, which is considered the oldest of the four Marian antiphons. As a part of the Catholic Reformation, the Salve Regina was prayed every Saturday by members of the Sodality of Our Lady, a Jesuit Marian association. The Hail Holy Queen is also the final prayer of the Rosary.

Ave Regina caelorum 

The Ave Regina caelorum (Hail, Queen of Heaven) is an early Marian antiphon, praising Mary, the Queen of Heaven. It is traditionally said or sung after each of the canonical hours of the Liturgy of the Hours. The prayer was once used after Compline, the final canonical hour of prayer before going to sleep, from the Feast of the Presentation (February 2) through the Wednesday of Holy Week. It is now used in the Liturgy of the Hours on the feast of the Assumption of Mary. The Ave Regina caelorum dates back in a different musical intonation to the 12th century. Today's version is slightly different from a 12th-century intonation. The Ave Regina caelorum has four parts: Ave, Salve, Gaude and Vale (in English: hail, rejoice, farewell). It was used for processions in honour of the Queen of Heaven. The Ave Regina caelorum received numerous musical versions, a famous one of which was composed in 1773 by Joseph Haydn.

Alma Redemptoris Mater 

The Alma Redemptoris Mater (Loving Mother of our Savior) is recited in the Catholic Church at Compline only from the first Sunday in Advent until the Feast of the Purification (February 2). Continuing theological discussions exist as to the origin and exact timing of this Marian antiphon. It has two equal parts: The Virgin Mary is the loving Mother of the Savior, the ever-virgin with a very high position in heaven. May she listen to her people with mercy in their need for her help.

Regina Caeli

The Regina Caeli (Queen of Heaven) is an anthem of the Catholic Church which replaces the Angelus during Eastertide, the fifty days from Easter Sunday to Pentecost Sunday. It is named for its opening words in Latin. Different musical settings of the words were composed throughout the centuries by known and unknown composers. Not all attributions are correct, as an often quoted Regina Caeli by Joseph Haydn was not by him. The anthem is of unknown authorship, and was in Franciscan use in the first half of the 13th century. Together with three other Marian anthems, it was incorporated in the Minorite Roman Curia Office, which the Franciscans soon popularized everywhere, and which by order of Pope Nicholas III (1277–1280) replaced all the older breviaries in the churches of Rome.

Veneration
The Catholic faith states, as a dogma, that Mary was assumed into heaven and is with Jesus Christ, her divine son. Mary should be called Queen, not only because of her Divine Motherhood of Jesus Christ, but also because God has willed her to have an exceptional role in the work of eternal salvation. Catholicism employs the liturgical Latin phrase Ora Pro Nobis, meaning pray for us, and does not teach adherents to worship saints, but rather ask (asking is a form of prayer) those saints to pray for them.  The encyclical Ad Caeli Reginam maintains that Christ as redeemer is Lord and King. The Blessed Virgin is Queen, because of the unique manner in which she assisted in our redemption, by giving of her own substance, by freely offering Him for us, by her singular desire and petition for, and active interest. Mary was chosen Mother of Christ so she might help fulfill God's plan in the redemption of humankind; The Catholic Church from the earliest times venerated the Queen of Heaven, according to Pius XII:

The Queenship of Mary is commemorated in the last of the Glorious Mysteries of the Holy Rosary—the Coronation of the Virgin as Queen of Heaven and Earth.

Parishes and private groups often process and crown an image of Mary with flowers. This often is referred to as a "May Crowning". This rite may be done on solemnities and feasts of the Blessed Virgin Mary, or other festive days, and offers the Church a chance to reflect on Mary’s role in the history of salvation.

The Virgin has been called "Queen of France" since 1638 when, partly in thanksgiving for a victory over the Huguenots and also in hope of the birth of an heir after years of childless marriage, Louis XIII officially gave her that title. Siena, Tuscany, hails the Virgin as Queen of Siena, and annually observes the race and pageant called the "palio" in her honor.

Mary was declared "Queen of Poland" by king John II Casimir during the Lwów Oath in the 17th century. Since then she is believed to save the country miraculously during Deluge, Partitions of Poland, Polish-Soviet War, World War II and the Polish People's Republic. The solemnity of Our Lady Queen of Poland is celebrated on 3 May.

Feast of Queenship of Mary

Queenship of Mary is a Marian feast day in the liturgical calendar of the Catholic Church, created by Pope Pius XII. On 11 October 1954, the pontiff pronounced the new feast in his encyclical Ad caeli reginam. The feast was celebrated on May 31, the last day of the Marian month. The initial ceremony for this feast involved the crowning of the Salus Populi Romani icon of Mary in Rome by Pius XII as part of a procession in Rome.

In 1969, Pope Paul VI moved the feast day to August 22, the former Octave day of the Assumption in order to emphasize the close bond between Mary's queenship and her glorification in body and soul next to her Son. The Second Vatican Council's Constitution on the Church states that "Mary was taken up body and soul into heavenly glory, and exalted by the Lord as Queen of the universe, that she might be the more fully conformed to her Son" (Lumen gentium, 59).

The movement to officially recognise the Queenship of Mary was initially promoted by several Catholic Mariological congresses in Lyon, France; Freiburg, Germany; and Einsiedeln, Switzerland. Gabriel Roschini founded in Rome, Italy, an international society to promote the Queenship of Mary, Pro Regalitate Mariae. Several popes had described Mary as Queen and Queen of Heaven, which was documented by Gabriel Roschini. Pope Pius XII repeated the title in numerous encyclicals and apostolic letters, especially during World War II.

Marian processions

In Los Angeles, California, a Marian procession took place annually for roughly the first 100 years following the founding of the city. In an attempt to revive the custom of religious processions, in September 2011 the Queen of Angels Foundation, founded by Mark Anchor Albert, inaugurated an annual "Grand Marian Procession" in the heart of Downtown Los Angeles' historic core. This yearly procession, intended to coincide with the anniversary of the founding of the City of Los Angeles, begins outside of the parish of La Iglesia de Nuestra Señora Reina de los Angeles which is part of the Los Angeles Plaza Historic District, better known as "La Placita". By way of city streets, the procession eventually terminates at the Cathedral of Our Lady of the Angels where a public Rosary and Mass in honour of the Blessed Virgin Mary are offered. Subsequent years have seen the involvement and participation of numerous chivalric, fraternal, and religious orders, parishes, lay groups, political figures, as well as other religious and civic organizations.

Art 

Early Christian art shows Mary in an elevated position. She carries her divine son in her hands, or holds him. After he ascended into heaven, he reigns in divine glory. Mary, his mother, assumed into heaven by her son, participates in his heavenly glory.

The earliest known Roman depiction of Santa Maria Regina depicting Mary as a queen dates to the 6th century and is found in the modest church of Santa Maria Antiqua (i.e., ancient St. Mary) built in the 5th century in the Forum Romanum. Here Mary is unequivocally depicted as an empress. As one of the earliest Roman Catholic Marian churches, this church was used by Pope John VII in the early 8th century as the see of the bishop of Rome. Also in the 8th century, the Second Council of Nicaea decreed that such pictures of Mary should be venerated.

In the early 16th century, Protestant reformers began to discourage Marian art, and some like John Calvin or Zwingli even encouraged its destruction. But after the Council of Trent in the mid-16th century confirmed the veneration of Marian paintings for Catholics, Mary was often painted as a Madonna with crown, surrounded by stars, standing on top of the world or the partly visible moon. After the victory against the Turks at Lepanto, Mary is depicted as the Queen of Victory, sometimes wearing the crown of the Habsburg empire. National interpretations existed in France as well, where Jean Fouquet painted the Queen of Heaven in 1450 with the face of the mistress of King Charles VII. Statues and pictures of Mary were crowned by kings in Poland, France, Bavaria, Hungary and Austria, sometimes apparently using crowns previously worn by earthly monarchs. A surviving small crown presented by Margaret of York seems to have been that worn by her at her wedding to Charles the Bold in 1463. A recent coronation was that of the picture of the Salus Populi Romani in 1954 by Pius XII. The veneration of Mary as queen continues into the 21st century, but artistic expressions do not have the leading role as in previous times.

Artworks, including paintings, mosaics and carvings of the coronation of Mary as Queen of Heaven, became increasingly popular from the 13th century onward. Works follow a set pattern, showing Mary kneeling in the heavenly court, and being crowned either by Jesus alone, or else by Jesus and God the Father together, with the Holy Spirit, usually in the form of a dove, completing the Trinity. The Coronation of Mary is almost entirely a theme of Western art. In the Eastern Orthodox Church, although Mary is often shown wearing a crown, the coronation itself never became an accepted artistic subject.

Gallery of art

Paintings

Statues

Frescoes

Altars

See also

 Hail Mary
 Madonna of humility
 Mariolatry
 Mother of the Church
 Mother of Mercy
 Our Lady, Star of the Sea Latin: stella maris
 Queen of Heaven (antiquity)
 Seat of Wisdom

References

Sources

External links
 Pope Pius XII. Ad Caeli Reginam
 Pope Benedict XVI. "On the Queenship of Mary', General Audience, August 22, 2012

Anglican Mariology
Biblical phrases
Christian terminology
Pope Pius XII Mariology
Protestant views on Mary
Catholic Mariology
Queen of Heaven
Titles of Mary
Heaven in Christianity